Hawley Heights Historic District is a national historic district located at Huntington, Huntington County, Indiana.   The district includes 87 contributing buildings and 7 contributing objects in an exclusively residential section of Huntington. It developed between about 1914 and 1954 and includes notable examples of Colonial Revival, Mission Revival, and Tudor Revival style architecture. A number of homes were built from plans prepared by the Architects Small House Service.

It was listed on the National Register of Historic Places in 2003.

References

Historic districts on the National Register of Historic Places in Indiana
Houses on the National Register of Historic Places in Indiana
Colonial Revival architecture in Indiana
Mission Revival architecture in Indiana
Tudor Revival architecture in Indiana
Historic districts in Huntington County, Indiana
National Register of Historic Places in Huntington County, Indiana
2003 establishments in Indiana